Arnbjørn Danielsen (born 14 October 1973) is a retired Faroese football defender.

References

1973 births
Living people
Faroese footballers
B68 Toftir players
B36 Tórshavn players
Association football defenders
Faroe Islands international footballers